Nganza is a commune of the city of Kananga in the Democratic Republic of the Congo.

History 
In March 2017, during the Kamuina Nsapu war more than 300 people were killed in the town.

References 

Kananga
Communes of the Democratic Republic of the Congo